Edin Smajić (born 30 August 1971) is a Bosnian retired football player.

Club career
He won the 1995–96 Bosnia and Herzegovina Football Cup with Čelik Zenica.

International career
Smajić made his debut for Bosnia and Herzegovina in a November 1997 friendly match away against Tunisia and has earned a total of 4 caps, scoring no goals. His final international was a June 1999 European Championship qualification match against the Faroe Islands.

References

External links

Profile - NFSBIH

1971 births
Living people
People from Donji Vakuf
Association football midfielders
Bosnia and Herzegovina footballers
Bosnia and Herzegovina international footballers
NK Čelik Zenica players
NK Iskra Bugojno players
NK Travnik players
FK Krajina Cazin players
Premier League of Bosnia and Herzegovina players
First League of the Federation of Bosnia and Herzegovina players